Tessa Giele (born 1 November 2002) is a Dutch competitive swimmer who specializes in butterfly events.

She competed at the 2021 FINA World Swimming Championships (25 m).

Personal bests

References

External links
 

2002 births
Living people
Dutch female butterfly swimmers
Sportspeople from South Holland
21st-century Dutch women
European Aquatics Championships medalists in swimming